Justin Hollins (born January 15, 1996) is an American football outside linebacker who is a free agent. He played college football at Oregon, and was selected by the Denver Broncos in the fifth round of the 2019 NFL Draft. He has also played for the Los Angeles Rams.

Early years
Hollins grew up in Arlington, Texas and attended Grace Preparatory Academy before transferring to Martin High School before his senior year. At Martin, Hollins played on the same defensive line as future 2017 NFL Draft first overall pick Myles Garrett and recorded 59 tackles and four sacks. He was rated a three-star prospect by several recruiting services and committed to play college football at the University of Oregon over offers from over a dozen schools including Oklahoma, Baylor, Oklahoma State and Iowa.

College career
Hollins played five seasons for the Oregon Ducks, redshirting his sophomore season. Hollins became a starter on the defensive line for the Ducks following his redshirt season, making 51 total tackles and finishing second on the team in both tackles for loss (9.5) and sacks (3). He recorded 59 tackles, 11.5 for a loss, with 4.5 sacks and an interception returned for a touchdown in his redshirt junior season. As a redshirt senior, Hollins was named first-team All-Pac-12 after making 64 total tackles, including 14.5 for loss, 6.5 sacks, five forced fumbles, an interception and six passes defended. He was the only player in FBS to have at least five sacks, five forced fumbles and one interception. Hollins finished his collegiate career with 184 total tackles (36 for loss), 14 sacks, two interceptions seven forced fumbles and three fumble recoveries. After the season, Hollins was invited to participate in the 2019 East–West Shrine Game and was named the game's defensive MVP after making 10 tackles, three of which were for a loss and two of which were sacks.

Professional career

Denver Broncos
Hollins was drafted by the Denver Broncos in the fifth round (156th overall) of the 2019 NFL Draft. The Broncos acquired this selection by trading Trevor Siemian to the Minnesota Vikings. Hollins signed a four-year rookie contract that included $300,000 in guaranteed money on May 14, 2019.

Hollins made his NFL debut on September 9, 2019, against the Oakland Raiders. Hollins recorded the first career sack on November 3, 2019, against the Cleveland Browns. Hollins finished his rookie season with 21 tackles, one sack and two passes defended in 15 games played.

On September 5, 2020, Hollins was waived by the Broncos.

Los Angeles Rams
On September 6, 2020, Hollins was claimed off waivers by the Los Angeles Rams. In Week 4 against the New York Giants, Hollins recorded his first sack as a Ram during the 17–9 win.
In Week 13 against the Arizona Cardinals, Hollins recorded a strip sack on Kyler Murray that was recovered by the Rams during the 38–28 win.

In Week 3 of the 2021 season, Hollins suffered a partially torn pec and was placed on injured reserve on September 27, 2021. He was activated on December 13. Hollins reached Super Bowl LVI where the Rams defeated the Cincinnati Bengals 23–20. Hollins had 1 tackle in the game. He was waived by the Rams on November 22, 2022.

Green Bay Packers
On November 24, 2022, Hollins was claimed off waivers by the Green Bay Packers.

NFL career statistics

Regular season

Postseason

References

External links
Green Bay Packers bio
Oregon Ducks bio

1996 births
Living people
Sportspeople from Arlington, Texas
Players of American football from Texas
American football linebackers
Oregon Ducks football players
Denver Broncos players
Los Angeles Rams players
Green Bay Packers players